GS 2000+25 is an X-ray binary system in the constellation Vulpecula, consisting of a late K-type star and a black hole. It is also an X-ray nova.

Properties
Because the black hole is more massive than the companion star, it is the primary of the system. The black hole has a mass of about 5 solar masses while the companion has a mass of about 0.5 solar masses. Because the companion star has a low mass, the system is a low-mass X-ray binary.

See also
 List of nearest black holes

References

Vulpecula
Vulpeculae, QZ
Stellar black holes
K-type main-sequence stars
Novae